Baucis means several things:

 A character in the Greek legend of Baucis and Philemon
 Asteroid 172 Baucis
 Friend of the ancient Greek poet Erinna, apostrophized in her long poem The Distaff
 An ancient Greek wrestler from Troezen. According to Pausanias, there was a statue of him created by Naucydes.